The Gansu pika (Ochotona cansus) or gray pika is a species of mammal in the pika family, Ochotonidae. It is endemic to China.

References

External links
 

Pikas
Mammals of China
Endemic fauna of China
Mammals described in 1907
Taxa named by Marcus Ward Lyon Jr.
Taxonomy articles created by Polbot